The Rama Aces are a Junior ice hockey team based in Rama, Ontario, Canada.  They play in the Greater Metro Junior A Hockey League.

History
The Aces were announced on February 17, 2012, by the GMHL.

On May 7, 2015, after three years in the league, the Aces announced that the league had granted the team a one-year leave of absence. TPA Sports had purchased the team the previous year. They have not yet returned to action in the league.

Season-by-season standings

References

External links
Aces Webpage
GMHL Webpage

Ice hockey teams in Ontario